Reynaldo Malonzo or Rey Malonzo is a former Filipino actor, film director and politician in the Philippines. He was a famous action star doing mostly martial arts in his films during the 1970s up to the 1980s.

Film career
In the 1970s, Malonzo rose to popularity by way of kung fu and karate movies. Malonzo, together with Ramon Zamora gave rise to the so-called Pinoy Bruce Lee clones in the late 70s. They starred in such films as Bruce Liit (1978) with Niño Muhlach, Ang Hari at ang Alas (1978), The Deadly Rookies (1978) with Rio Locsin and Kambal Dragon (1978). He did also a string of martial arts films including Chaku Master in 1974, and They Call Him Bruce Lee in 1979. In the 1980s, he became a director using his alternate name, Reginald King in his films, Pedrong Palaka (1980), Tigre Ng Sierra Madre (1982), Roman Sebastian (1983), and Maestro Bandido (1983) among others. In 1987, he starred with American actors David Anderson, Brett Baxter Clark, and Robert Patrick for the film Eye of the Eagle. In 2019, he returned to television via FPJ's Ang Probinsyano.

Political career
He became a mayor for three consecutive terms in Caloocan. In 1995, he ran for mayor and he defeated Macario 'Boy' Asistio. A year later, Asistio loyalists filed a recall petition against Malonzo. A recall election was conducted, and Malonzo still emerged as the winner. He was reelected as mayor in the 1998 polls. In 2001, Malonzo won a third term, this time against former Congressman Luis 'Baby' Asistio.

He graduated with a degree in Police Science from the Pamantasan ng Lungsod ng Maynila.

Filmography

Film

Television

See also
Caloocan
2010 Caloocan local elections

References

External links

Filipino actor-politicians
Living people
Male actors from Metro Manila
Mayors of Caloocan
Pamantasan ng Lungsod ng Maynila alumni
Year of birth missing (living people)
People's Reform Party politicians
Nationalist People's Coalition politicians
Filipino male film actors
Filipino male television actors